Gregor Zupanc, (born 5 July 1976) is a Serbian film and television director.

Career 
His feature film Mediteran was shown at the Independent Film Festival in Los Angeles in December 2008 and premiered domestically in 2009.

In 2011, he co-directed the drama series Igrač which aired on RTS.

In 2012 and 2013, Zupanc created and produced Moj Lični Pečat, an educational series which presents stories by famous people in the realm of art, culture and science.

In the fall of 2015, RTS began airing the mini-series Radiovizija directed by Zupanc. The series focuses on the stories of famous Belgrade residents based on the archives of Radio Belgrade.

Filmography 
 Ka. K. (1998)  – produced by RTS
 Rez (1999) – produced by Dunav Film
 Osnivači Slavije (1999)  – produced by Dunav film 
 Pećina (The  Cave) (1999) – produced by Dunav film
 Ulicom Sedam Mladih (2003) – produced by RTS
 Personal and Other Stories from Belgrade and  Pristina (2011) – supported by the Open Society Foundations
 Lestvica (The Scale)  (2005) – produced by RTS
 Mediteran (2008) – produced by the Akademski Filmski Centar (AFC)

Television 
 Igrač (2011)
 Radiovizija (2014–15)

References

External links 
  
 Official website

1976 births
Living people
Serbian music video directors
Serbian film directors
Television producers